Chakaten is a village in the Kapan Municipality of the Syunik Province in Armenia.

Demographics 
The Statistical Committee of Armenia reported its population as 137 in 2010, down from 190 at the 2001 census.

Gallery

References 

Populated places in Syunik Province